The Hilversum Town Hall (Dutch: Raadhuis Hilversum) was designed by Willem Marinus Dudok to serve as seat of the municipal council of Hilversum in the Netherlands. Construction was completed in 1931. It is a much-admired building that is considered the finest example of Dudok’s work and internationally recognized as one of the most influential buildings of its time.

Planning stage 
Dudok became Director of Public Works of Hilversum in 1915. Initially, he designed a traditional building intended to fit into the town’s downtown area.  However, due to World War I and lack of funds this was not constructed. Dudok presented the first sketches for a new design in 1924, for which he was able to use an elevated location to the northwest of the town centre. This location, which did not constrain the building with composition or height restrictions, gave Dudok the freedom to express his considerable capabilities. It is surrounded by a park and the light-coloured building rises from water, highlighting the garden city character that Hilversum wanted to achieve.

The building 
Somewhat reminiscent of the early designs of Frank Lloyd Wright, the Town Hall building consists of two squares; an inner courtyard surrounded by offices and a second courtyard surrounded by low spaces and traversed by a service road. This remarkable and in many ways unique structure was completed in 1931, by which time Dudok was Hilversum’s Municipal Architect, and was enthusiastically embraced by the people of Hilversum for its balance between form and function, fine workmanship and high quality finishes and materials used. Some critics, however, accused Dudok of diluting modernist designs and being halfway modernist, lacking a specific style. However, the end result is considered by many to be a testament to the consistent harmonic form, function, art and human need. Hilversum Town Hall is one of the most successful buildings in the history of the modernist movement.

Subsequent history 
During World War II the building was used as headquarters of the German Wehrmacht, for which it was necessary to camouflage the prominent tower. The sound of its bell was broadcast live every hour on public radio stations until the 1960s, reflecting the town’s role as the principal media centre for the Netherlands.  The building was restored between 1989 and 1995. Restoration costs caused some dispute, as it was for a time proposed to sell a painting by Mondrian, who came from nearby Amersfoort, to pay for the restoration.

References

City and town halls in the Netherlands
Hilversum
Government buildings completed in 1931
Rijksmonuments in North Holland
Brick Expressionism
Modernist architecture in the Netherlands